Nigger: The Strange Career of a Troublesome Word is a 2002 book by Randall Kennedy of Harvard Law School about the history and sociology of the word nigger.

The book was prominently featured in an episode of Boston Public in which a white teacher, played by Michael Rapaport, attempted to employ the book to teach his students about the history and controversy surrounding the word (season 2, episode 15: "Chapter Thirty-Seven").

Further reading 
 Nigger: The Strange Career of a Troublesome Word – online book preview at Google Books. .

External links
PopMatters review by James Withers
 "The N-Word as Therapy for Racists" by Martin Kilson
 Booknotes interview with Kennedy on Nigger, March 3, 2002.
 Not While Racism Exists, by Gary Younge

2002 non-fiction books
African-American culture
Books in semantics